South African art is the visual art produced by the people inhabiting the territory occupied by the modern country of South Africa. The oldest art objects in the world were discovered in a South African cave. Archaeologists have discovered two sets of art kits thought to be 100,000 years old at a cave in South Africa. The findings provide a glimpse into how early humans produced and stored ochre – a form of paint – which pushes back our understanding of when evolved complex cognition occurred by around 20,000 – 30,000 years. Also, dating from 75,000 years ago, they found small drilled snail shells could have no other function than to have been strung on a string as a necklace. South Africa was one of the cradles of the human species.

The scattered tribes of Khoisan and San peoples moving into South Africa from around 10000 BC had their own art styles seen today in a multitude of cave paintings. They were superseded by Bantu and Nguni peoples with their own vocabularies of art forms.

In the present era, traditional tribal forms of art were scattered and re-melded by the divisive policies of apartheid. New forms of art evolved in the mines and townships: a dynamic art using everything from plastic strips to bicycle spokes. In addition to this, there also is the Dutch-influenced folk art of the Afrikaner Trek Boers and the urban white artists earnestly following changing European traditions from the 1850s onwards, making for an eclectic mix which continues to evolve today.

Paleolithic rock art

The pre-Bantu peoples migrating southwards from around the year 30,000 BC were nomadic hunters who favoured caves as dwellings. Before the rise of the Nguni peoples along the east and southern coasts and central areas of Africa these nomadic hunters were widely distributed. It is thought they entered South Africa at least 1000 years ago. They have left many signs of life, such as artwork (San paintings) depicting hunting, domestic and magic-related art. There is a stylistic unity across the region and even with more ancient art in the Tassili n'Ajjer region of northern Africa, and also in what is now desert Chad but was once a lush landscape.

The figures are dynamic and elongate, and the colours (derived probably from earthen and plant pigments and possibly also from insects) combine ochreous red, white, grey, black, and many warm tones ranging from red through to primary yellow. Common subjects include hunting, often depicting with great accuracy large animals which no longer inhabit the same region in the modern era, as well as: warfare among humans, dancing, domestic scenes, multiple images of various animals, including giraffes, antelope of many kinds, and snakes. The last of these works are poignant in their representation of larger, darker people and even of white hunters on horseback, both of whom would supplant the San peoples.
 
Many of the "dancing" figures are decorated with unusual patterns and may be wearing masks and other festive clothing. Other paintings, depicting patterned quadrilaterals and other symbols, are obscure in their meaning and may be non-representational. Similar symbols are seen in shamanistic art worldwide. This art form is distributed from Angola in the west to Mozambique and Kenya, throughout Zimbabwe and South Africa and throughout Botswana wherever cave conditions have favoured preservation from the elements.

Contemporary art in South Africa

The contemporary art scene in South Africa is as diverse and vibrant as the population and vast cultures in the country. Contemporary artists in South Africa have adopted new media technologies to produce varied and creative bodies of work, as seen in the work of Dineo Seshee Bopape and CUSS Group. Their art gives insight into the pressing issues of South African society. On a global scale, contemporary South African art is relevant and sought-after. A charcoal and oil on canvas work by leading South African contemporary artist William Kentridge was sold on auction for R3,5 million in London in 2012.

Black art post-apartheid 
The Bantu Education Act of 1955 barred Black South Africans from receiving formal art training during the years of apartheid and as a result, the artistic movements that had originated from this community have, until recently, been distinctly classified as “craft” rather than “art.” Informal art centers, that were funded by European states, became one of the few avenues in which Black South Africans could receive some form of artistic development. Throughout this time period from 1947 to the mid-1990s, the first practitioners to receive this informal training began passing down their knowledge to younger generations of practitioners. However, the traditional canon of African art, categorized as “fine art” had been formed in the 20th century by European and U.S. art audiences. South Africa's inequality gap is larger than that of other countries in the world so the audience for art is primarily the rich and not those who are subject to the artistic expression, giving these higher socio-economic groups a gatekeeper status in deciding what is classified as art. After the Soweto Riots of 1976, a new social consciousness emerged that retaliated against the government's policy of segregation and effectively reexamined the classification of certain Black South African artworks. One of the first artistic styles to receive critic attention was Venda sculpting because it aesthetically appealed to white patrons while also maintaining its “artistic manifestations of ethnic diversity.” These sculptures would be considered “transitional art” rather than “craft” and would gain access into fine art galleries. Other Black artistic expressions such as beadwork, photography, and studio arts have also begun to be slowly integrated into canonical South African art forms.

The Johannesburg Biennale's Africus (1995) and Trade Routes (1997) had a significant impact on the cultural awareness of new South African art. These events were among the first exhibitions that revealed the “new South African art” to the international community, but also other local South Africans. This gave Black South African artists a new platform to express the effects to which apartheid had influenced society. In the post-apartheid regime, artists have now been given an apparatus to protest social issues such as inequality, sexuality, state control over the personal realm, and HIV/AIDS. However, the emphasis to embody many of these social issues within Black South African art has a led to a stereotype that many young artists are now trying to escape. International pressure has been said to once again demand a level of ‘authenticity’ within South African art that portrays discourse on the topic of apartheid. Scholar Victoria Rovine goes as far as to state that “these exhibitions represent a South Africa that seeks liberation not from apartheid itself but from apartheid as an already predictable subject for artistic production.” Furthermore, although South African art is not always political, conversations stemming from its interpretation are rarely apolitical and the high demand for apartheid symbols by private collectors have raised concerns over the collection of the art for the sake of nostalgia.

Artistic education in South Africa

Major universities and tertiary institutions offer Fine Art, Music, Photography and other creative disciplines:
Nelson Mandela Metropolitan University
Michaelis School of Fine Art, University of Cape Town
North-West University
Stellenbosch University
UNISA
Wits School of Arts
Tshwane University of Technology (TUT)
Ruth Prowse School of Art
Cape Peninsula University of Technology (CPUT)
National School of the Arts
University of Pretoria
University of Fort Hare
University of Johannesburg Faculty of ART, Design & Architecture
Rhodes University
Vaal University of Technology

See also
Culture of South Africa
List of South African artists
South Africa
Outline of South Africa

References

Further reading 

 
http://blogs.scientificamerican.com/creatology/stone-age-art-kit-found-in-south-african-cave/

External links 

Artthrob
Goodman Gallery
StateoftheART

 
South Africa